Monmouth Academy may refer to:
Monmouth Academy (Maine)
Monmouth Academy (New Jersey)